Events in the year 1922 in China.

Incumbents
 President – Xu Shichang, Li Yuanhong
 Premier of the Republic of China – Liang Shiyi until January 25, Yan Huiqing until August 5, Wang Chonghui until November 29, Wang Daxie

Events
April 10 – June 18 – First Zhili–Fengtian War

Births
 January 21 – Qin Yi
 January 29 – Li Huatian
 March 26 – Yuan Xuefen
 August 16 – Jiao Yulu
 October 24 – Mao Anying
 November 26 – Yang Gensi
 December – Lu Yongfu

Deaths
June 23 – Wu Tingfang, Qing Dynasty envoy to the United States 1896–1902, 1907–1909

See also
Warlord Era

References

 
Years of the 20th century in China